Boško Petrović was a Serbian novelist and poet. He was also secretary and president of Matica Srpska.

Biography
Boško Petrović was born on 7 January 1915 in Oradea Mare (Veliki Varadin), grew up in Morović, and was educated in Novi Sad and Belgrade. During World War II, he was captured and taken to a German POW camp, and after the war, he settled in Novi Sad. He worked in the publishing company Budućnost, then in the publishing company Matica Srpska, for a while as a director and then as an editor-in-chief, until his retirement in 1981. He was a member of the editorial board of the "Chronicle" of Matica Srpska (1953-1964), editor of the "Chronicle" of Matica Srpska(1965-1969), secretary of Matica Srpska (1969-1979), president of Matica Srpska (since 1991) and longtime member of the Board of the Serbian Literary Association. He was elected a corresponding member of the Serbian Academy of Sciences and Arts on 21 March 1974, and a full member on 7 May 1981. He died in Novi Sad on 30 June 2001.

Literary career
Boško Petrović started his literary work in high school when he published his first poems. In addition to poems, he wrote short stories ("Earth and Sea", 1950; "Slightly Promising Clouds", 1955; "Sep", 1960;  "Conversation on Secrets", 1974), novels ("Diary of a German Soldier", 1962; "Arrival at the End of Summer," 1970; "Singer I and II", 1979), essays on literature and art (Dan među slikama, 1973). He was also known as a theatre critic and a well-known translator from German into Serbian, especially the works of Thomas Mann, Erich M. Remarque, Rainer Rilke, Bertolt Brecht.

See also
 List of Serbian writers

References 

1915 births
2001 deaths
20th-century Serbian novelists
People from Oradea
Serbian translators
Matica srpska
Members of the Serbian Academy of Sciences and Arts
20th-century Serbian poets
Serbian male poets